On December 14, 1993, four employees were shot and killed and a fifth employee was seriously injured at a Chuck E. Cheese's restaurant in Aurora, Colorado, United States. The perpetrator, 19-year-old Nathan Dunlap, a former employee of the restaurant, was frustrated about being fired five months prior to the shooting and sought revenge by committing the attack. He fled the scene of the shooting with stolen money and restaurant items.

Dunlap was found guilty of four counts of first-degree murder, attempted murder, and other charges, and was sentenced to death by lethal injection on May 17, 1996. A judge initially set an execution date for him in August 2013, but Colorado Governor John Hickenlooper signed a temporary reprieve that would postpone Dunlap's execution date.

Dunlap's death sentence was commuted to life in prison without parole in 2020 after Colorado abolished the death penalty.

Shooting
Nathan Dunlap entered the restaurant at 9:00 p.m., where he ordered a ham and cheese sandwich and played an arcade game. He then hid in a restroom at about 9:50 p.m. He exited the restroom after closing at 10:05 p.m. and shot five employees with a .25-caliber semiautomatic pistol.

Dunlap first shot Sylvia Crowell, 19, who was cleaning the salad bar. She was hit from close range in the right ear and was mortally wounded. Ben Grant, 17, was fatally shot near the left eye as he was vacuuming. Colleen O'Connor, 17, pleaded for her life and sank to her knees, but Dunlap fatally shot her once through the top of her head. Bobby Stephens, 20, the lone survivor of the shooting, returned to the restaurant after taking a smoke break outside, thinking the noise he heard from inside the restaurant were children popping balloons nearby.

As Stephens walked into the restaurant and unloaded utensils into the dishwasher, Dunlap came through the kitchen door, raised the handgun at him, and fired a shot that struck Stephens in the jaw. Stephens fell to the floor and played dead. Dunlap then forced Marge Kohlberg, 50, the store manager, to unlock the safe. After she opened it, Dunlap shot her in the ear. As he was taking the cash out of the safe, Dunlap fired a second fatal shot through Kohlberg's other ear after he noticed she was still moving. The manager who fired Dunlap was not present at the restaurant.

Stephens escaped through a back door and walked to the nearby Mill Pond apartment complex, where he pounded on a door to alert someone that he and others had been shot at the restaurant. Stephens was hospitalized at Denver General Hospital in fair condition. As authorities arrived on the scene, they found two bodies in the restaurant's hallway, a third in a room off the hallway, and the fourth in the manager's office. Crowell was sent to Denver General Hospital, where she was declared brain dead. She died from her injuries the next day at Aurora Regional Medical Center.

Dunlap fled the scene with $1,500 worth of cash and game tokens he stole from inside the restaurant. He was arrested at his mother's apartment twelve hours later.

Legal proceedings
Dunlap was found guilty of four counts of first-degree murder, attempted murder, robbery, and burglary in 1996. On May 17 of that year, Dunlap was sentenced to death and an additional 108 years. During his sentencing he swore repeatedly in an outburst that lasted for three minutes.

In 2008, Dunlap filed a habeas corpus petition with the court, arguing that his trial attorney was ineffective by not presenting a defense on his mental health issues and child abuse. In August 2010, this federal appeal was rejected. Senior U.S. District Judge John L. Kane wrote that Dunlap was fairly tried, competently represented, and justifiably sentenced to death.

On April 16, 2012, the 10th Circuit Court of Appeals denied Dunlap's appeal of his death sentence. Dunlap's lawyers argued before the 10th Circuit that Dunlap's trial lawyers were negligent during the sentencing, by not providing evidence that Dunlap suffers from a mental illness. They argued that if the jurors heard evidence of Dunlap's mental illness, that it would spare Dunlap from being sentenced to death.

On May 1, 2013, Judge William Sylvester announced that the execution date for Dunlap would be in mid-August 2013.

On May 22, 2013, Dunlap's execution was put on hold, as Colorado Governor John Hickenlooper decided against executing Dunlap or granting him clemency and instead signed a "temporary reprieve" in 2013. The reprieve meant that as long as Hickenlooper was governor, Dunlap would not likely be executed. According to Hickenlooper, one of the reasons that he did not choose full clemency was because Dunlap would have to remain segregated from the rest of the prison population. Groups, including the NAACP, contacted Hickenlooper requesting the sparing of Dunlap's life, arguing that the death penalty is disproportionately imposed on African Americans and Hispanics.  The reprieve also meant that unless a governor issues a new Executive Order, the status of the execution and clemency request remain on hold.  Hickenlooper was constitutionally limited from running for a third term.

On November 6, 2018, Jared Polis was elected governor.  During the campaign, Polis said he intended to sign a bill repealing the death penalty in Colorado. Regarding the Dunlap case, Polis said he had no problem following the current law, and that he did not think it was appropriate to comment on a specific case during a campaign before actually becoming governor and reviewing the case to make an informed decision.

On March 23, 2020, Polis signed a bill repealing the death penalty. Polis also commuted the sentences for all three men on death row, including Dunlap, to life without parole.

Perpetrator

Nathan Jerard Dunlap (born April 8, 1974) was raised by his adoptive father and biological mother, who married each other when Nathan was a few months old. He had never met his biological father. Dunlap was raised in Chicago, Illinois; Memphis, Tennessee; and Michigan, and then moved to Colorado in 1984. Dunlap's mother struggled with mental health issues and was diagnosed with schizophrenia and bipolar disorder. At least twice in Dunlap's junior high school years, he attempted suicide. When Dunlap was 14, his adoptive father asked the psychologist at Overland High School to evaluate him, and testing revealed signs of hypomania. No further treatment or formal diagnostic was applied.

He committed several armed robberies at the age of fifteen, using a golf club and then firearms. He spent time incarcerated at a juvenile detention center, and due to an erratic episode, he was sent to a psychiatric hospital. When released, he began selling drugs. Dunlap was arrested five times on misdemeanor offenses in 1993.

Dunlap began working at the restaurant in May 1993 and was fired in July after a disagreement he had with his supervisor over schedule hours. Acquaintances of Dunlap said he was frustrated over the firing, and told a former coworker that he planned to "get even" about the termination.

See also 

 2012 Aurora, Colorado shooting
 Capital punishment in Colorado

References

Attacks on buildings and structures in the United States
Attacks on restaurants in North America
Deaths by firearm in Colorado
December 1993 crimes
December 1993 events in the United States
History of Aurora, Colorado
Mass murder in Colorado
Mass murder in 1993
Mass shootings in Colorado
Mass shootings in the United States
Mass murder in the United States
1993 in Colorado
1993 mass shootings in the United States
1993 murders in the United States